Kobs is a surname. Notable people with the surname include:

John Kobs (1898–1968), American athlete and coach
Karsten Kobs (born 1971), German hammer thrower

See also
Drayton McLane Baseball Stadium at John H. Kobs Field, baseball stadium in East Lansing, Michigan